Cricket at the 2015 Pacific Games in Port Moresby, Papua New Guinea, was held from 6–18 July 2015. A women's tournament was held for the first time, and Samoa won the event to become the first country other than Papua New Guinea to win a gold medal in Pacific Games cricket. In the men's tournament (held the week after the women's event), Vanuatu won the gold medal. The shorter Twenty20 form of the game was used for both the men's and women's competitions.

Medal summary

Medal table

Results

Participating teams
Six women's teams and four men's teams played in the respective tournaments:

Women:
 
 
 
 
 
 

Men:

Because Papua New Guinea's men's team was competing at the 2015 World Twenty20 Qualifier at the same time, they were represented by an "A" team at the Pacific Games, captained by Chris Amini.

Standings

Men

Women

See also
 Cricket at the Pacific Games

References

 
2015 Pacific Games
Pacific
2015
International cricket competitions in Papua New Guinea